Ayala Malls is a retail subsidiary of real estate company Ayala Land, an affiliate of Ayala Corporation. Founded in 1988, Ayala Malls own a chain of large shopping malls, all located in the Philippines. Ayala Malls is the one of the largest shopping mall retailer in the Philippines, along with SM Supermalls and Robinsons Malls.

Retail centers

Existing

Flagship projects
 Alabang Town Center (opened on 1982) — Alabang-Zapote Road cor. Madrigal Ave. Ayala Alabang, Muntinlupa, Metro Manila
 Glorietta (opened on 1988/1991) —  Ayala Center, Makati, Metro Manila
 Greenbelt (opened on 1988/1991) — Ayala Center, Makati, Metro Manila
 Ayala Center Cebu (opened on 1994) — Cardinal Rosales Ave. cor. Luzon and Mindanao Ave. Cebu Business Park, Cebu City
 Market! Market! (opened on 2004) — Carlos M. Garcia Ave cor. Mckinley Parkway Bonifacio Global City, Taguig, Metro Manila
 TriNoma (opened on 2007) — EDSA cor. North and Mindanao Ave. Diliman, Quezon City, Metro Manila
 Bonifacio High Street (opened on 2007) — Bonifacio Global City, Taguig, Metro Manila
 Marquee Mall (opened on 2009) — Aniceto Gueco Ave. cor. North Luzon Expressway, Pulung-Maragul, Angeles City, Pampanga
 Abreeza (opened on 2011) — Ayala Business Park, J.P Laurel Ave. Bajada, Davao City
 Harbor Point (opened on 2012) —Rizal Avenue, Subic Bay Freeport Zone, Olongapo, Zambales
 Centrio (opened on 2012) — Claro M. Recto Ave. cor. Osmeña Street, Brgy. 24, Cagayan de Oro, Misamis Oriental
 U.P. Town Center (opened on 2013) — Commonwealth Ave. Diliman, Quezon City, Metro Manila
 Fairview Terraces (opened on 2014) — Quirino Highway, Novaliches, Quezon City, Metro Manila
 Ayala Malls Serin (opened on 2015) — Tagaytay-Nasugbu Road, Tagaytay, Cavite
 Ayala Malls Solenad (opened on 2009; launched as an Ayala Mall on 2015) — Nuvali, Santo Domingo, Santa Rosa, Laguna
Ayala Malls Legazpi (opened on 2016) — Capantawan, Legazpi, Albay
 Ayala Malls South Park (opened on 2016) —Near Skyway Viaduct, Alabang, Muntinlupa, Metro Manila
 Ayala Malls The 30th (opened on 2017) — Meralco Ave. Ortigas Center, Pasig, Metro Manila
 Ayala Malls Vertis North (opened on 2017) —  EDSA, Diliman, Quezon City, Metro Manila
 Ayala Malls Cloverleaf (opened on 2017) — A. Bonifacio Ave cor. EDSA, Balintawak, Quezon City, Metro Manila
 Ayala Malls Marikina (opened on 2017) — Marikina Heights, Marikina, Metro Manila
 Ayala Malls Feliz (opened on 2017) —Marcos Highway, Dela Paz, Pasig, Metro Manila
 Ayala Malls Circuit (opened on 2018) — J. P Rizal Ave. Circuit Makati, Makati, Metro Manila
 Ayala Malls Capitol Central (opened on 2018) —Gatuslao St, Capitol Central, Bacolod, Negros Occidental
 Ayala Malls Manila Bay (opened on 2019) — Aseana City, Parañaque, Metro Manila
 Ayala Malls Central Bloc (opened on 2019) —I. Villa cor. V. Padriga and W. Geonzon St, Cebu IT Park, Cebu City

The District malls
 The District – Imus —Aguinaldo Highway cor. Daang Hari Road, Anabu 2–D, Imus, Cavite
 The District – North Point —Lacson Ave. Zone 15, Talisay, Negros Occidental
 The District – Dasmariñas — Governor's Drive, Salawag, Dasmariñas, Cavite

Community and Ayala managed malls

 Park Square — Ayala Center, Makati, Metro Manila
 Metro Point — Pasay, Metro Manila
 Pavilion Mall —Pan-Phillipine Highway, San Antonio, Biñan, Laguna

Strip malls
 The Walk at Cebu IT Park (opened on 2008) — Cebu IT Park, Cebu City
 The Shops at Atria (opened on 2015) — San Rafael, Mandurriao, Iloilo City
 Garden Bloc at Cebu IT Park (opened on 2015) — Cebu IT Park, Cebu City
 The Shops at Azuela Cove (opened on 2021) — Azuela Cove, V. Hizon Sr., Buhangin, Davao City
 The Shops at Triangle Gardens (opened on 2022) — Ayala Triangle Gardens, Makati, Metro Manila

Under construction and planned
 One Ayala (opening in 2023) —EDSA, Ayala Center, Makati, Metro Manila
 Ayala Malls Arca South — Arca South, Taguig, Metro Manila
 Ayala Malls Gatewalk Central — M. Logarta Ave, Subangdaku, Gatewalk Central, Mandaue, Cebu
 Ayala Malls Park Triangle — Bonifacio Global City, Taguig, Metro Manila
 Ayala Malls Vermosa — Daang Hari Road, Pasong Buaya, Imus, Cavite
 The Shops at Seagrove — Punta Engaño, Lapu-Lapu City
 Ayala Malls Parklinks — Bagumbayan, Quezon City, Metro Manila
 Ayala Malls Evo City — Batong Dalig, Kawit, Cavite
 Ayala Malls Atria — San Rafael, Mandurriao, Iloilo City
 Azuela High Street - Azuela Cove, Buhangin, Davao City
 Ayala Malls Cresendo - Luisita, Tarlac City
 Ayala Malls Boulevard - Tacloban, Leyte

See also
Ayala Center
Ayala Corporation
Ayala Land

References

External links
 Ayala Malls — Official website
 Ayala Malls on Facebook
 Ayala Malls on Twitter
 Ayala Malls — Community website

 
Retail companies of the Philippines
Shopping center management firms
Companies based in Makati
Real estate companies established in 1988
Retail companies established in 1988
Philippine brands
1988 establishments in the Philippines